Emily Morse Symonds (1860 – 12 September 1936), known as an author by her pen name George Paston, was a British author and literary critic.

Biography and family
Symonds was born on 4 September 1860, in St-Mary-in-the-Marsh parish, Sprowston, near Norwich, England. She was the niece of John Addington Symonds, the respected English poet and literary critic. During her writing career, she became close friends with another eminent literary critic, Arnold Bennett.

She died in her home, shortly after her seventy-sixth birthday, of apparent heart failure.

Career

Novels
Symonds made her first literary breakthrough at age 31, when she anonymously authored a short article, "Cousins German", in the Cornhill Magazine. Her first book, A Modern Amazon, in 1894, was noted by The Academy in volume 55 as having "some wit and a general readableness."

Her last novel, A Writer of Books, was published in 1898. The book dealt with the barriers faced by women writers within the publishing industry, which was then dominated by men. These two works—as well as the four that came betwixt the two—led to Symonds  being described as "a writer with a purpose." This last book is widely viewed as her best. Symonds herself viewed it thus, her friend Arnold Bennett wrote, "She is halfway through [A Writer of Books], which she says will be her best." Trotter agreed with the author's self-assessment, stating categorically that the book is her best work.

Origin of pen name
Writing during a time period when writing and publishing was a male-dominated industry, it was not uncommon to see a woman such as Symonds adopt either a gender neutral, or even a male pen name. The Academy noted that Symonds was "one of the many women writers who have succumbed to the mysterious attraction of the name 'George'." It has been speculated that perhaps she assumed the pen name at least partially as a means "to gain an unqualified entrance into the profession." The particular choice of the Christian name "George" has been attributed to a "mysterious attraction" that the name holds, as was George Eliot, the pen name of famed English author, Mary Anne Evans. Another famous female writer who chose George in her pen name was Amantine/Amandine Aurore Lucile Dupin, also known as George Sand.

Despite her adoption of a masculine pen name, it was no secret that she was, in fact female. The Academy went so far as to question why she even maintained the facade. Ultimately, they simply chalked it up to "a whim."

References

External links
 
 
 

1860 births
1936 deaths
English essayists
English women novelists
19th-century pseudonymous writers
Pseudonymous women writers
British women essayists
People from Sprowston
English women non-fiction writers